Bed Head is a line of haircare and nail products created by Toni & Guy and distributed by TIGI Linea, which has been producing the line since its inception. The cosmetics line was first produced in 2003. A line produced by the company, called Boby by Bed Head, was released and is under a UK patent. Other lines produced by the company are being distributed by the Helen of Troy company as of May 2007.  As of July 2007, the product line was chosen to be used by the Dallas Cowboy Cheerleaders. Before starring in the American TV show Passions, actor Adrian Bellani was a spokesperson and model for the products.

In March 2003, the producers of the products and Health Canada issued a notice about counterfeit products being sold in Canada. The recalled products said to contain Enterobacter gergoviae or Burkholderia cepecia, which may cause infections if applied to the eyes. This case, along with others, is one motivation to toughen the intellectual property laws in Canada.

Starting in 2011, Bed Head partnered up with Villy Custom to build custom luxury fashion bikes for their brand.

References

External links
 Official site

Personal care brands
Unilever brands